Bob Minor may refer to:

 Plain bob minor, a course of bell change ringing; see Change ringing#Plain Bob
 Robert Lee Minor (born 1944), American stunt performer